Tartu Science Park is a science park in Tartu, Estonia. The sciene park is founded in 1992, being the first science park in Baltics.

The science park is a home for over 80 companies, including electronics and apparatus building companies, biomedicine companies, and information and communication technologies. The science park has also been a home for several start-up companies which later has grown big, e.g. Click & Grow.

References

External links
 

Science and technology in Estonia
Tartu